Yeda Pessoa de Castro is a Brazilian ethnolinguist. With a PhD in African Languages at the National University of Zaire, she is a Technical Consultant in African Languages for the  Museu da Língua Portuguesa at the Estação da Luz  in São Paulo, a Member of the Academia de Letras da Bahia  and of the ANPOLL's GT de Literatura Oral e Popular. Also is a Permanent Member of the Brazilian Scientific Committee of the  Project "Slave Route" by UNESCO .

Biography
de Castro was born in Salvador, Bahia. Retired as a teacher from the Federal University of Bahia (UFBA)  is currently a Technical Advisor and Professor at the University of the State of Bahia (UNEB), with the Post-Graduation Program for Languages Studies - PPGEL , where she teaches African languages and cultures in Brazil. Also is Director and founder of the GEAALC - Studies Group of African and Afro-Brazilian Languages and Cultures.

Notable accomplishments
 Technical Consultant in African Languages for the Estação da Luz da Nossa Língua Project, by the Roberto Marinho Foundation, São Paulo, from 2004.
 Counselor of the Palmares Cultural Foundation, Ministry of Culture, Brasília, 2001-2003.
 Cultural Attache at the Brazilian Embassy, Port of Spain, Trinidad and Tobago, 1986-1988.
 Consultant and advisor in developing projects in Education at the State University of Santa Cruz - UESC / Ba - Department of Arts and Letters, Kawe Center for Afro-Bahian Regional Studies, 2000-2001.
 Member of the Scientific Council and the Reading Committee of the International Colloquium "Le Monde et le Gabon Iberique, Université Omar Bongo [5], Libreville, Gabon, May/2002.
 Permanent Member of the Scientific Board of the Journal Kilombo, publication of [CERAFIA], Omar Bongo University, Gabon
 Reviewer for [CAPES] and various books, magazines and scientific journals in Brazil and abroad.
 Visiting Professor at universities in Africa and the Caribbean, where she also served as Cultural Attache at the Brazilian Embassy in Trinidad and Tobago.
 First Brazilian to defend post-graduate thesis at an African university and the only one so far in her specialty.
 In Bahia, was Director of the Centro de Estudos Afro-Orientais - CEAO, founded the Afro-Brazilian Museum in Salvador and is currently Visiting Professor of Post-Graduate Studies at the University of the State of Bahia, where she teaches African languages and cultures in Brazil.
 The importance of her work, resulting from over thirty years of research on both sides of the Atlantic, received international recognition. Constantly present at international conferences in various countries, invited by the UN, UNESCO and academic institutions where African studies are taken seriously. With many papers on linguistic and cultural Brazil-Africa relations, the body of her work is considered everywhere as a renewal in African-Brazilian studies, due to the discovery of the extent of the Bantu influence in Brazil and for the introduction of its speakers participation in the formation of Brazilian Portuguese.
 Author of Falares africanos na Bahia: um vocabulário afro-brasileiro (Brazilian Academy of Letters / Topbooks Press, 2001, 2nd edition 2005), acclaimed by critics as the most important and complete work  written so far on African languages in Brazil, a book that has already become a classic in the field, and of the A língua mina-jeje no Brasil: um falar africano em Ouro Preto do século XVIII(João Pinheiro Foundation, Department of Culture of Minas Gerais, 2002), has also written numerous articles and lectures published in scientific journals, conference proceedings, etc.. in Brazil and abroad.

Books
(2009) - Falares africanos na Bahia: um vocabulário afro-brasileiro. Rio de Janeiro: Academia Brasileira de Letras/ Topbooks Editora e Distribuidora de Livros Ltda. (2ª ed. - new print)
(2005) - Falares africanos na Bahia: um vocabulário afro-brasileiro. Rio de Janeiro: Academia Brasileira de Letras/ Topbooks Editora e Distribuidora de Livros Ltda. (2ª ed.)
(2002) - A língua mina-jeje no Brasil: um falar africano em Ouro Preto do século XVIII. Belo Horizonte: Fundação João Pinheiro (Coleção Mineiriana).
(2001) - Falares africanos na Bahia - um vocabulário afro-brasileiro. Rio de Janeiro, Academia Brasileira de Letras/ Topbooks Editora e Distribuidora de Livros Ltda.

Awards and honors
 Comendadora of the Order of Rio Branco  by the Ministério das Relações Exteriores  in 1997.
 Comenda Maria Quitéria by the Câmara de Vereadores of the City of Salvador  in 1989.
 Socio-Meritorious by the  Afro-Brazilian Cult Foundation of Bahia - FEBACAB in 1994.
 Honored as a great benefactor of the Afro-Brazilian Bantu Terreiros components of the Eco-Bantu, in São Paulo, 2008.
 Honored by the Afoxé Filhos do Congo, Carnival 2007. Salvador, Bahia.
 Honored by the Cultural Group Afoxé Loni  for her life and work devoted to the study of the Afro-Brazilian Culture and Language, at the Carnival of Cultures in Berlin, Germany in May 2008.

Brazilian women
Ethnolinguists
Year of birth missing (living people)
Living people
Linguists from Brazil